In physics and mathematics, axiality and rhombicity are two characteristics of a symmetric second-rank tensor in three-dimensional Euclidean space, describing its directional asymmetry. 

Let A denote a second-rank tensor in R3, which can be represented by a 3-by-3 matrix. We assume that A is symmetric. We assume that they are ordered such that 
 

The axiality of A is defined by

The rhombicity is the difference between the smallest and the second-smallest eigenvalue:

Other definitions of axiality and rhombicity differ from the ones given above by constant factors which depend on the context.

Applications
The description of physical interactions in terms of axiality and rhombicity is frequently encountered in spin dynamics and, in particular, in spin relaxation theory, where many traceless bilinear interaction Hamiltonians, having the (eigenframe) form

(hats denote spin projection operators) may be conveniently rotated using rank 2 irreducible spherical tensor operators:

where  are Wigner functions,  are Euler angles, and the expressions for the rank 2 irreducible spherical tensor operators are:

Defining Hamiltonian rotations in this way (axiality, rhombicity, three angles) significantly simplifies calculations, since the properties of Wigner functions are well understood.

References

 D.M. Brink and G.R. Satchler, Angular momentum, 3rd edition, 1993, Oxford: Clarendon Press.
 D.A. Varshalovich, A.N. Moskalev, V.K. Khersonski, Quantum theory of angular momentum: irreducible tensors, spherical harmonics, vector coupling coefficients, 3nj symbols, 1988, Singapore: World Scientific Publications.
 I. Kuprov, N. Wagner-Rundell, P.J. Hore, J. Magn. Reson., 2007 (184) 196-206. Article

Tensors